Claudio Centurión (born July 21, 1983 in Concepción, Paraguay) is a Paraguayan footballer currently playing for Nacional Potosí of the Primera División in Bolivia.

Teams
  Argentino de Quilmes 2006
  Sacachispas 2006-2008
  Nacional Potosí 2009
  Guabirá 2010
  Real Potosí 2011–2012
  Nacional Potosí 2012–2013
  San José 2013-2014
  Nacional Potosí 2014-2015
  Real Potosí 2015-2017
  Sportivo Trinidense 2018

References
 
 

1983 births
Living people
People from Concepción, Paraguay
Paraguayan footballers
Paraguayan expatriate footballers
Nacional Potosí players
Club Real Potosí players
Expatriate footballers in Bolivia
Expatriate footballers in Argentina
Paraguayan expatriate sportspeople in Bolivia
Paraguayan expatriate sportspeople in Argentina
Association footballers not categorized by position